Klyuchi is a rural locality (a settlement) in Ust-Kamchatsky District of Kamchatka Krai, Russia, located on the Kamchatka River,  to the north of Klyuchevskaya Sopka volcano. It had a population of  a marked decrease from that of  the population at its peak numbered

Geography
The settlement is located near the point where the course of the Kamchatka River turns from north to east.

History
It was founded in 1731. In 1951, it was granted urban-type settlement status and in 1979—town status. In 2004, it was demoted to a rural locality in order to become eligible for increased funding from the Russian federal budget.

Military
Klyuchi, being in a very isolated part of the former Soviet Union, has been near an intercontinental ballistic missile testing range since the Cold War, the Kura Missile Test Range, and is served by Klyuchi air base just southwest of the town. It was abandoned in the 1960s and is being reclaimed by forest.

Transportation 
There is a road connecting Klyuchi to Petropavlovsk-Kamchatskiy. Driving, according to Google Maps, it takes several hours.

Climate
Klyuchi has a typical subarctic climate (Köppen climate classification Dfc), albeit with slight early dry-summer precipitation patterns. Summers are generally mild and rainy with cool nights, while winters are long, cold, and very snowy. Due to Klyuchi being located in the interior, the maritime influence is less than for Petropavlovsk-Kamchatsky.

References

External links
Unofficial website of Klyuchi 

Rural localities in Kamchatka Krai
Populated places established in 1731
Road-inaccessible communities of Russia